Clara Cleghorn Hoffman (January 18, 1831 – February 13, 1908) was an American temperance activist. She was a lecturer within the National Woman's Christian Temperance Union (WCTU). Hoffman was born in New York state, but became identified with the white-ribbon movement in Kansas City, Missouri, giving up her position as principal of a school to enter its ranks. Under her leadership, Missouri became one of the best organized of states, while her growing power and popularity as a leader were evidenced by the fact that for five years of her state presidency, there was not one ballot cast against her. At the Chicago Convention in 1893, she was made Assistant Recording Secretary, and at Cleveland, 1894, chosen Recording Secretary to succeed Lillian M. N. Stevens.

Early years and education
Clara Cleghorn was born in De Kalb, New York, January 18, 1831. She was the eleventh child in a family of thirteen children, seven daughters and six sons. She was the daughter of Humphrey Cleghorn, a Scotchman. He was an abolitionist and a conductor on the famous "underground railroad" in the anti-slavery days. Her mother was Olive Ruruham, daughter of Major Elisha Burnham, who bore an honorable part in the Revolutionary War.

She received her education in New York and Massachusetts.

Career
In 1861, she married Dr. Goswin Hoffman, a German physician. For twelve years, she was principal of Lathrop School in Kansas City, Missouri. In 1882, she was appointed, by the general officers of the National WCTU, president of the Missouri WCTU, Frances E. Willard having visited Kansas City to look over the ground and having learned of the mental powers and vigorous executive talents of Hoffman, her success as a teacher, her remarkable voice and elocutionary training, and her earnest Christianity. 

At that time, one of the leading merchants in the city, in whose home Willard was entertained, said to her: "If you have come here to speak and organize a Woman's Christian Temperance Union, you are welcome, hut if you have come to spirit away Mrs. Clara Hoffman from our schools, then I, as a member of the school board, have a controversy with you, however cordially I may treat you as my guest." But Hoffman had felt inspired to join the crusade movement, and she left an assured position. It was within a year well-managed, and in 1883, being duly elected by the State convention, Hoffman left her position and entered upon the work. Front that time on, the work in Missouri, which had been playfully railed "poor old Misery" by the white-ribboners, forged forward, until it attained a position hardly-second to that of any State in the Union. Every town and village had its local association. Hoffman's labor was almost incessant. She rallied the forces with the skill of a major-general, drilling them with the thoroughness that her long experience as a teacher had caused to become second nature, and inspiring them with zeal. No woman has been better loved by her associates. Headquarters were established in Kansas City, where systematic work was planned. Temperance sentiment was cultivated. Improved legislation on many lines was secured, and the good work continued with Hoffman at the head.

Her powers as a speaker, her strength in debate on the floor of the National WCTU convention, caused her to become a national leader, and a national organizer. She was one of its fittest survivals, by sheer force of intellect, pluck and devotion. She was in demand from Maine to California, and made endless trips, speaking and organizing. Her powers upon the platform were greatly developed. The courage and vigor with which she attacked conservatism made her a tremendous power before an audience.

She was the delegate of the National WCTU at the Woman's Council in Washington, D.C. To her was given the honor of being one of the most honored delegates at the London Convention.

Hoffman has two sons. Shed died February 13, 1908, in Kansas City of pneumonia.

References

Attribution

Bibliography

External links
 

1831 births
1908 deaths
Woman's Christian Temperance Union people
People from De Kalb, New York
American temperance activists
Wikipedia articles incorporating text from A Woman of the Century